The Black Guerrilla Family (BGF, also known as the Black Family, the Black Vanguard, and Jamaa) is an African-American black power prison and street gang founded in 1966 by George Jackson, George "Big Jake" Lewis, and W. L. Nolen while they were incarcerated at San Quentin State Prison in Marin County, California.

Philosophy and goals

Inspired by Marcus Garvey, the Black Guerilla Family (BGF) characterizes itself as an ideological African-American MarxistLeninist revolutionary organization composed of prisoners. It was founded with the stated goals of promoting black power, maintaining dignity in prison, and overthrowing the United States government. The BGF's ideological and economic aims, collectively known as "Jamaanomics", are laid out in the group's Black Book. Contemporarily, the group engages in primarily criminal activity with rival gangs rather than political activity.

History
The Black Guerrilla Family was founded by George Jackson in San Quentin State Prison during the Black Power movement.

Fay Stender attempted murder
In 1979, former BGF lawyer Fay Stender was shot five times by recently paroled Black Guerilla Family member Edward Glenn Brooks for Stender's alleged betrayal of George Jackson. Brooks forced Stender to state: "I, Fay Stender, admit I betrayed George Jackson and the prison movement when they needed me most" just before he shot her. Stender was left paralyzed below the waist by the assault and in constant pain. She committed suicide in Hong Kong shortly after she testified against Brooks.

Huey P. Newton murder
On August 22, 1989, co-founder and leader of the Black Panther Party for Self Defense, Huey P. Newton was fatally shot outside 1456 9th St. in West Oakland by 25-year-old Black Guerilla Family member Tyrone Robinson. Relations between Newton and factions within the Black Guerilla Family had been strained for nearly two decades. Many former Black Panthers who became BGF members in jail were disenchanted with Newton for his perceived abandonment of imprisoned Black Panther Party members. In his book, Shadow of the Panther, Hugh Pearson alleges that Newton was addicted to crack cocaine, and his extortion of local BGF drug dealers to obtain free drugs added to their animosity.

Robinson was convicted of the murder in August 1991 and sentenced to 32 years for the crime.

Baltimore unrest

In 2015, Baltimore police stated that the Black Guerrilla Family, the Bloods, and the Crips were "teaming up" to target police officers. Later, however, leaders of both the Bloods and the Crips denied the allegations, released a video statement asking for calm and peaceful protest in the area, and joined with police and clergy to enforce the curfew. At one occasion, gang members helped to prevent a riot at the Security Square Mall by dispersing attempted rioters. On other occasions, rival gang members helped each other to protect black-owned businesses, black children, and reporters, diverting rioters to Chinese- and Arab-owned businesses instead.

Symbols
 Crossed sabres, machetes, rifles, shotguns with the letters (B G F) or (2.7.6.)
 A black dragon.

See also
 Hugo Pinell
 Latin Kings

References

External links
 FBI files on the Black Guerrilla Family

Organizations established in 1966
1966 establishments in California
African-American socialism
Black Power
Communist organizations in the United States
Communism in Maryland
Far-left politics in the United States
Left-wing militant groups
African-American gangs
Prison gangs in the United States
Gangs in California
Gangs in San Francisco
Gangs in Maryland
Gangs in Baltimore
African-American history in the San Francisco Bay Area
African-American history in Baltimore